Royal College Sports Complex is the rugby union grounds of Royal College Colombo, it was formerly known as the Royal College Rugby Grounds. It is home to multi-use stadium and sports complex. Built in 2000, with funds from the Royal College Union (RCU), current students and parents; it is managed by a Board of Management appointed by the RCU.

History
The land on the eastern side of Reid Avenue, was part of the Colombo Racecourse and the Colombo Turf Club. During World War II it was the site of the RAF airstrip. When horse racing declined after gambling was outlawed in the 1950s Colombo Racecourse and its land fell into disuse and was taken over by the government. The large land extent was segmented and distributed to government entities. Royal College Colombo, received a four-acre plot which became the Royal College Rugby Grounds.

In 2000, work began at the rugby grounds for a state of the art sports complex up to international standards to host multiple sports and a modern gymnasium. The indoor stadium houses a 450 seating capacity along with two squash courts with a 150-seat capacity and a badminton courts with 250 seats. In 2013 an additional seating tier, the "Royal -Brandix Sky Pavilion", was constructed increasing the outdoor arena capacity to 12,500 including the terraces. The complex also boasts a 120 unit car park with basement parking.

Sports
Royal College Sports Complex grounds serves as a venue for rugby union, football, baseball, and hockey. The indoor stadium is a venue for squash, badminton, basketball, volleyball, and boxing.

Major Events
Bradby Shield Encounter
Sri Lankan National Badminton Championships

References

External links
Another Closely Contested Bradby Shield

Sports Complex
Sports venues in Colombo